Sunshine railway station may refer to:

Sunshine railway station, Brisbane
Sunshine railway station, Melbourne